In numerical analysis and applied mathematics, sinc numerical methods are numerical techniques for finding approximate solutions of partial differential equations and integral equations based on the translates of sinc function and Cardinal function C(f,h) which is an expansion of f defined by

where the step size h>0 and where the sinc function is defined by

Sinc approximation methods excel for problems whose solutions may have singularities, or infinite domains, or boundary layers.

The truncated Sinc expansion of f is defined by the following series:
 .

Sinc numerical methods cover
function approximation,
approximation of derivatives,
approximate definite and indefinite integration,
approximate solution of initial and boundary value ordinary differential equation (ODE) problems,
approximation and inversion of Fourier and Laplace transforms,
approximation of Hilbert transforms,
approximation of definite and indefinite convolution,
approximate solution of partial differential equations,
approximate solution of integral equations,
construction of conformal maps.
Indeed, Sinc are ubiquitous for approximating every operation of calculus

In the standard setup of the sinc numerical methods, the errors (in big O notation) are known to be  with some c>0, where n is the number of nodes or bases used in the methods.

Reading

References

Numerical analysis